Olivia Julianna (born 2002) is an American political activist, abortion rights advocate, and strategist from Texas. She is the director of Politics & Government Affairs for Gen-Z for Change. She focuses on using social media to encourage civic engagement on topics such as abortion rights and climate pollution. She is named one of the 50 Most Influential people who defined 2022 by Bloomberg Media.

Early life and education 
Olivia Julianna was born in 2002. She lives in Houston, Texas. She goes by her first and middle name publicly for safety. She identifies as a "queer, plus-size, disabled Latina" and is a fourth-generation Texan. She is of Mexican-American descent. She attended University of Houston–Victoria where she majored in Political Science. , she plans to graduate with a bachelor's degree in 2024. She credits the American Rescue Plan for sending her to college, allowing her to become the first person in her family to graduate from college.

Activism 
It wasn't until mid-2021 that she considered herself a political activist. Olivia Julianna uses social media for her posts about election results, political causes, and activism. She is most active on TikTok and Twitter, with an audience of over 1 million, across all her social platforms.

Gen-Z for Change 
As a digital content creator, Julianna began developing political social media content during the 2020 United States presidential election. Julianna became involved with Gen-Z for Change. In October 2022, she became its director of politics and government affairs. This is a collective of Gen-Z activists that use social media to raise awareness and fundraise for causes.

Fight against Texas Right to Life 
Texas Right to Life is a non-profit organization that "fight for the rights of the unborn". This organization is "the oldest and largest statewide Pro-life organization in Texas". They created a way to anonymously report abortions. This Senate Bill 8 allows anyone to sue those who perform an abortion, or helps someone access the procedure. She posted a video on TikTok in which she explained that people could submit any content as a way. The website ultimately crashed, and the hosting site ended its relationship with Texas Right to Life.

Abortion Funds 
In July 2022, US Republican Congressman representative Matt Gaetz tweeted criticism directed at Julianna and publicly made comments about her body at the Turning Point USA summit in Florida.  She then rallied her Twitter followers to donate money into an abortion fund, and supporters donated more than $2 million to the Gen-Z for Choice Abortion Fund.

Recognition 
In December 2022, Bloomberg Media named her one of the 50 Most Influential people who defined 2022. She also attended the 2023 State of the Union Address as a guest of U.S. representative Nanette Barragán.

References 

Living people
Place of birth missing (living people)
American abortion-rights activists
American activists of Mexican descent
21st-century LGBT people
American political activists
American women activists
Activists from Texas
LGBT people from Texas
LGBT Hispanic and Latino American people
American political consultants
Women in Texas politics
Queer women
21st-century American women
2002 births
Date of birth missing (living people)
University of Houston–Victoria alumni